Mediacorp Raintree Pictures was a film production company based in Singapore. The company, a division of Mediacorp Group, was established on 1 August 1998. It produced the Singaporean comedy, Liang Po Po: The Movie featuring the cross-dressing Jack Neo. It financed The Truth About Jane and Sam, produced by Hong Kong's Film Unlimited and directed by Derek Yee. This film garnered a Best New Performer nomination at the 19th Hong Kong Film Awards for its lead actress, Fann Wong from Singapore.

Since then, Raintree Pictures has co-produced many films with other countries, including The Eye, The Eye 2 and Infernal Affairs II.  Many of its films have won awards, such as the Golden Horse Awards from Taiwan, where child actress Megan Zheng won the Best Newcomer Award for her performance in Homerun. In 2002, Singaporean satirical film I Not Stupid held the top position at the weekend box office chart in Singapore. It was later released in other countries such as Malaysia, Hong Kong and China.

The company closed down in 2012.

Films made
2012 Dance Dance Dragon (龙众舞)
2011 It's A Great Great World (大世界)
2010 Kidnapper (绑匪)
2009 The Wedding Game (大喜事)
2008 Sing to the Dawn
2008 Painted Skin (画皮)
2008 Money No Enough 2 (钱不够用2)
2008 12 Lotus (十二莲花) 
2008 Rule No. 1 (第一戒)
2008 The Leap Years (誓约)
2008 Ah Long Pte Ltd (老师嫁老大)
2007 The Tattooist
2007 The Home Song Stories (意)
2007 881 
2007 Protégé (Co-produced with Artforce International) (门徒)
2007 One Last Dance (茶舞)
2006 I Not Stupid Too (小孩不笨2)
2005 The Maid (女佣)
2005 I Do, I Do (爱都爱都)
2004 The Best Bet (突然发财)
2004 The Eye 2 (Co-produced with Applause Pictures) (见鬼2)
2003 Infernal Affairs II (Co-produced with Media Asia) (无间道II)
2003 Turn Left, Turn Right (Co-produced with Warner Bros. Asia) (向左走向右走)
2003 Homerun (跑吧,孩子)
2002 The Eye (Co-produced with Applause Pictures) (见鬼)
2002 I Not Stupid (小孩不笨)
2001 One Leg Kicking (一脚踢)
2001 The Tree (孩子•树)
2000 Chicken Rice War (鸡缘巧合)
2000 2000 AD (Co-produced with Millenium Films for United States) (公元2000AD)
1999 The Truth About Jane and Sam (Co-produced with Film Unlimited) (真心话)
1999 Liang Po Po: The Movie (梁婆婆重出江湖)

External links
Official website
Mediacorp website

1998 establishments in Singapore
Mediacorp
Film production companies of Singapore
Mass media companies established in 1998